The Eighth Oklahoma Legislature was a meeting of the legislative branch of the government of Oklahoma, composed of the Oklahoma Senate and the Oklahoma House of Representatives. The state legislature met in Oklahoma City, in regular session from January 4 to April 2, 1921, and in special session from April 25 to May 21, 1921, during the third year of the term of Governor James B.A. Robertson. It was the first time, Republicans took control of the Oklahoma House of Representatives. In 1920, Bessie McColgin, a Republican, became the first woman elected to the Oklahoma House of Representatives. Lamar Looney, Oklahoma's first female state senator and a Democrat, was also elected in 1920.

Impeachment charges were brought against lieutenant governor in the Oklahoma House of Representatives, but not sustained by the state senate.

T. C. Simpson served as the President pro tempore of the Oklahoma Senate and George Blaine Schwabe served as the Speaker of the Oklahoma House of Representatives.

Dates of sessions
Regular session: January 4-April 2, 1921
Special session: April 25-May 21, 1921
Previous: 7th Legislature • Next: 9th Legislature

Major events
on Republicans held the majority of seats in the Oklahoma House of Representatives for the first time in state history, allowing them to select the chamber's leaders.
The first female state legislators in Oklahoma served in the 1921 session.
The Republican-dominated House brought impeachment charges against Lieutenant Governor Martin Trapp and narrowly failed to approve impeachment charges against both the state treasurer and Oklahoma Governor James Robertson. The Democratic-dominated Senate did not sustain the impeachment charges against Trapp.

Party composition

Senate

House of Representatives

Leadership
T. C. Simpson of Thomas, Oklahoma, served as President pro tempore of the Oklahoma Senate in 1921. George B. Schwabe was Speaker of the Oklahoma House of Representatives.

Members

Senate

Table based on state almanac.

House of Representatives

Table based on government database.

References

External links
Oklahoma Legislature
Oklahoma House of Representatives
Oklahoma Senate

Oklahoma legislative sessions
1921 in Oklahoma
1922 in Oklahoma
1921 U.S. legislative sessions
1922 U.S. legislative sessions